This is a list of moths of Mexico about which we have WP articles, giving the evidence needed for their presence in this list.

List 

 Acalyptris paradividua
 Acalyptris terrificus
 Acalyptris yucatani
 Acanthodica daunus
 Acanthodica grandis
 Accinctapubes apicalis
 Acleris potosiana
 Acleris retrusa
 Acleris zimmermani
 Acontia areletta
 Acrocercops demotes
 Acrocercops gemmans
 Acrocercops marmaritis
 Actias truncatipennis
 Adhemarius donysa
 Adhemarius gannascus
 Adhemarius mexicanus
 Adhemarius ypsilon
 Adoxobotys cacidus
 Adoxobotys cristobalis
 Adoxobotys discordalis
 Aerotypia
 Aethes ignobilis
 Aethes tuxtlana
 Aethesoides allodapa
 Aethesoides inanita
 Aethesoides mexicana
 Aethesoides timia
 Agaraea emendatus
 Agylla nubens
 Agylla perpensa
 Aleptina clinopetes
 Allanwatsonia
 Alpheias baccalis
 Alpheias conspirata
 Alpheias gitonalis
 Alucita flavicincta
 Alucita nasuta
 Amaxia fallaciosa
 Amaxia juvenis
 Amorbia chiapas
 Amorbia cordobana
 Amorbia eccopta
 Amorbia monteverde
 Amorbia potosiana
 Amorbia stenovalvae
 Amorbimorpha powelliana
 Amorbimorpha schausiana
 Amorbimorpha spadicea
 Anacampsis cenelpis
 Anacampsis conistica
 Anacampsis quinquepunctella
 Anacampsis rhabdodes
 Anacampsis tridentella
 Anacampsis ursula
 Anania antigastridia
 Anania caudatella
 Anania federalis
 Anania intinctalis
 Anarnatula sylea
 Anaxita tricoloriceps
 Anoncia crossi
 Anopina albomaculana
 Anopina albominima
 Anopina apicalis
 Anopina asaphes
 Anopina asuturana
 Anopina bifurcatana
 Anopina bloomfieldana
 Anopina bonagotoides
 Anopina chelatana
 Anopina chemsaki
 Anopina chipinquensis
 Anopina circumtila
 Anopina condata
 Anopina confusa
 Anopina dentata
 Anopina desmatana
 Anopina durangoensis
 Anopina glossana
 Anopina gnathodentana
 Anopina griseana
 Anopina guerrerana
 Anopina hermana
 Anopina impotana
 Anopina incana
 Anopina iturbidensis
 Anopina macrospinana
 Anopina manantlana
 Anopina metlec
 Anopina minas
 Anopina parasema
 Anopina perplexa
 Anopina phaeopina
 Anopina pinana
 Anopina potosiensis
 Anopina praecisana
 Anopina psaeroptera
 Anopina pseudominas
 Anopina pseudotilia
 Anopina quadritiliana
 Anopina revolcaderos
 Anopina rusiasana
 Anopina sacculapinana
 Anopina scintillans
 Anopina soltera
 Anopina transtiliana
 Anopina undata
 Anopina unicana
 Anopina volcana
 Anopina wellingi
 Anopina xicotepeca
 Anopina yecorana
 Anopina yolox
 Anstenoptilia marmarodactyla
 Antaeotricha admixta
 Antaeotricha ammodes
 Antaeotricha caprimulga
 Antaeotricha ceratistes
 Antaeotricha comosa
 Antaeotricha cryeropis
 Antaeotricha demotica
 Antaeotricha discolor
 Antaeotricha elaeodes
 Antaeotricha ergates
 Antaeotricha forreri
 Antaeotricha fractilinea
 Antaeotricha frontalis
 Antaeotricha fumifica
 Antaeotricha hemibathra
 Antaeotricha incompleta
 Antaeotricha isosticta
 Antaeotricha machetes
 Antaeotricha ribbei
 Antaeotricha zelotes
 Antepione tiselaaria
 Anycles cupreus
 Apeplopoda ochracea
 Apilocrocis pseudocephalis
 Apilocrocis yucatanalis
 Apistosia tenebrosa
 Apocera zographica
 Apolychrosis ambogonium
 Apolychrosis candidus
 Apolychrosis ferruginus
 Apolychrosis synchysis
 Aponia aponianalis
 Aponia itzalis
 Apotoforma ptygma
 Aptunga macropasa
 Arachnis martina
 Arachnis mishma
 Arachnis tristis
 Argyractoides gontranalis
 Argyractoides rinconadalis
 Argyria supposita
 Argyrotaenia bialbistriata
 Argyrotaenia chiapasi
 Argyrotaenia confinis
 Argyrotaenia cupreographa
 Argyrotaenia glabra
 Argyrotaenia montezumae
 Argyrotaenia octavana
 Argyrotaenia parturita
 Argyrotaenia polvosana
 Argyrotaenia ponera
 Argyrotaenia potosiana
 Argyrotaenia spinacallis
 Argyrotaenia unda
 Argyrotaenia urbana
 Arispe concretalis
 Arispe ovalis
 Aristotelia dasypoda
 Aristotelia hieroglyphica
 Aristotelia pantalaena
 Aristotelia pyrodercia
 Aristotelia squamigera
 Arogalea albilingua
 Arogalea archaea
 Arogalea senecta
 Ategumia dilecticolor
 Atepa cordobana
 Atepa sinaloana
 Atepa triplagata
 Aulacodes citronalis
 Auratonota effera
 Auratonota oxytenia
 Auratonota serotina
 Auratonota spinivalva
 Autochloris patagiata
 Batrachedra knabi
 Batrachedra linaria
 Batrachedra theca
 Bonagota chiapasana
 Bonagota mexicana
 Bucculatrix parthenica
 Bucculatrix stictopus
 Callionima denticulata
 Callionima falcifera
 Callionima inuus
 Callionima nomius
 Callionima pan
 Carales astur
 Carmenta mimosa
 Catabenoides vitrina
 Cathegesis vinitincta
 Chamelania jaliscana
 Chionodes bufo
 Chionodes cacoderma
 Chionodes cerussata
 Chionodes concinna
 Chionodes creberrima
 Chionodes neptica
 Chionodes pleroma
 Chionodes scotodes
 Cibyra mexicanensis
 Cibyra terea
 Coleophora decipiens
 Coleophora mexicana
 Coleophora pelinopis
 Crambus angustexon
 Crambus autotoxellus
 Crambus bidentellus
 Crambus damotellus
 Crambus lascaellus
 Crambus racabellus
 Cyclophora coecaria
 Cydia saltitans
 Desmia albisectalis
 Desmia bifidalis
 Desmia hadriana
 Desmia pantalis
 Diastictis albovittalis
 Doa dora
 Dolicharthria retractalis
 Drastea
 Elaphria agrotina
 Elaphria nucicolora
 Elaphria subobliqua
 Elysius paranomon
 Elysius proba
 Elysius thrailkilli
 Eois agroica
 Eois coloraria
 Eois costalaria
 Eois haltima
 Eois isabella
 Eois mexicaria
 Eois nacara
 Eois nundina
 Eois operbula
 Eois ops
 Eois saria
 Eois toporata
 Eois veniliata
 Epermenia parastolidota
 Epicrisias
 Eriopyga crista
 Estigmene acrea
 Eulepte concordalis
 Eupackardia
 Eupithecia alogista
 Eupithecia balteata
 Eupithecia capitata
 Eupithecia cercina
 Eupithecia chimera
 Eupithecia chrodna
 Eupithecia classicata
 Eupithecia conduplicata
 Eupithecia consors
 Eupithecia discipuncta
 Eupithecia dustica
 Eupithecia endonephelia
 Eupithecia endotherma
 Eupithecia exophychra
 Eupithecia glaucotincta
 Eupithecia goslina
 Eupithecia indecisa
 Eupithecia kurtia
 Eupithecia lechriotorna
 Eupithecia leucographata
 Eupithecia magnifacta
 Eupithecia mediobrunnea
 Eupithecia microleuca
 Eupithecia molliaria
 Eupithecia mollita
 Eupithecia muscula
 Eupithecia obliquiplaga
 Eupithecia pactia
 Eupithecia pallidistriga
 Eupithecia pertacta
 Eupithecia pictimargo
 Eupithecia pieria
 Eupithecia planipennis
 Eupithecia platymesa
 Eupithecia rauca
 Eupithecia sellia
 Eupithecia sellimima
 Eupithecia subalba
 Eupithecia subanis
 Eupithecia supporta
 Eupithecia violetta
 Eupithecia westonaria
 Eutachyptera
 Eutelia ablatrix
 Eutelia furcata
 Evergestis insiola
 Fernandocrambus harpipterus
 Fernandocrambus nergaellus
 Fernandocrambus ruptifascia
 Fissicrambus adonis
 Fundella argentina
 Geitocochylis tarphionima
 Gnamptonychia flavicollis
 Haplochrois otiosa
 Helcystogramma daedalea
 Helcystogramma juventellus
 Helcystogramma scintillula
 Helcystogramma virescens
 Hellinsia beneficus
 Hellinsia chamelai
 Hellinsia emmorus
 Hellinsia epileucus
 Hellinsia falsus
 Hellinsia fishii
 Hellinsia fissuralba
 Hellinsia fumiventris
 Hellinsia hoguei
 Hellinsia homodactylus
 Hellinsia longifrons
 Hellinsia phlegmaticus
 Hellinsia phloeochroa
 Hellinsia socorroica
 Hellinsia sublatus
 Hellinsia tetraonipennis
 Hellinsia tinctus
 Hemaris thysbe
 Herpetogramma acyptera
 Herpetogramma cora
 Herpetogramma emphatica
 Herpetogramma holochrysis
 Herpetogramma junctalis
 Herpetogramma nigripalpis
 Herpetogramma pachycera
 Herpetogramma straminea
 Herpetogramma stramineata
 Hileithia rhealis
 Homoeocera papalo
 Horama panthalon
 Hypenolobosa glechoma
 Hyptiharpa hypostas
 Iscadia aperta
 Ischnurges bagoasalis
 Keiferia lycopersicella
 Leptosteges decetialis
 Lineodes fontella
 Lintneria xantus
 Lipocosma isola
 Macaria abydata
 Macasinia chorisma
 Magiriopsis
 Mannina hagnoleuca
 Megacaphys
 Melipotis contorta
 Microcrambus croesus
 Microcrambus elpenor
 Microcrambus jolas
 Microcrambus priamus
 Microcrambus rotarellus
 Mictopsichia atoyaca
 Mictopsichia mincae
 Mocis diffluens
 Monarda oryx
 Myolisa
 Myrmecopsis strigosa
 Neopalpa donaldtrumpi
 Niphadophylax mexicanus
 Nola involuta
 Nyctosia poicilonotus
 Odonthalitus lacticus
 Oiketicus kirbyi
 Opharus calosoma
 Opharus euchaetiformis
 Opharus linus
 Opharus momis
 Parategeticula pollenifera
 Parochromolopis mexicana
 Parornix impressipenella
 Parornix micrura
 Patania silicalis
 Pediasia mexicana
 Peridroma saucia
 Petrophila herminalis
 Phaloesia
 Phalonidia plicana
 Phassus phalerus
 Phobetron hipparchia
 Phostria citrinalis
 Phostria leucophasma
 Phostria temira
 Phyllonorycter acanthus
 Phyllonorycter chalcobaphes
 Phyllonorycter durangensis
 Phyllonorycter pictus
 Phyllonorycter splendidus
 Pilocrocis calamistis
 Pilocrocis granjae
 Polygrammodes baeuscalis
 Polygrammodes cyamon
 Polygrammodes fenestrata
 Polygrammodes hartigi
 Polygrammodes modestalis
 Polygrammodes naranja
 Prodoxus intricatus
 Pseudlithosia
 Pseuduncifera euchlanis
 Pyrausta deidamialis
 Pyrausta dissimulans
 Pyrausta euchromistes
 Pyrausta flavibrunnea
 Pyrausta morelensis
 Pyrausta postaperta
 Pyrausta rhodoxantha
 Pyrausta salvia
 Pyrausta trizonalis
 Quasieulia jaliscana
 Recurvaria flagellifer
 Recurvaria picula
 Recurvaria sartor
 Recurvaria sticta
 Recurvaria thysanota
 Schausiana
 Schinia erythrias
 Scopula calotis
 Scopula cavana
 Scopula enucloides
 Scopula grasuta
 Scopula irrubescens
 Scopula ordinaria
 Scopula thrasia
 Scopula vigensis
 Scopula vittora
 Smerinthus saliceti
 Spanioptila eucnemis
 Sphinx perelegans
 Spodoptera latifascia
 Spodoptera ornithogalli
 Stenucha
 Stigmella maya
 Stigmella racemifera
 Stilbosis amphibola
 Stilbosis incincta
 Stilbosis juvenis
 Syllepte aechmisalis
 Syllepte angulifera
 Syllepte brunnescens
 Syllepte coelivitta
 Syllepte diacymalis
 Thaumatopsis digrammellus
 Thaumatopsis melchiellus
 Tinacrucis apertana
 Tiquadra mallodeta
 Tiracola grandirena
 Tortriculladia belliferens
 Trichaea hades
 Triclonella xanthota
 Trogolegnum
 Zenamorpha

References

Lepidoptera of Mexico
Moths
Mexico
Mexico
Mexico